General Rodin may refer to:

Alexey Rodin (1902–1955), Soviet Army colonel general
Georgy Rodin (1897–1976), Soviet Army lieutenant general
Viktor Rodin (1928–2011), Soviet Army colonel general